Tourism is the largest industry in Nepal and its largest source of foreign exchange and revenue. Possessing eight of the ten highest mountains in the world, Nepal is a hot spot destination for mountaineers, rock climbers and people seeking adventure. The Hindu and Buddhist heritage of Nepal and its cool weather are also strong attractions.

Overview

Mount Everest, the highest mountain peak in the world (8848.88m above the sea level), is located in Nepal. Mountaineering and other types of adventure tourism and ecotourism are important attractions for visitors. The world heritage site Lumbini, birthplace of Buddha, is located in the south of the West region of Nepal (which despite the name is located in the center of the country) and there are other important religious pilgrimage sites throughout the country. The tourist industry is seen as a way to alleviate poverty and achieve greater social equity in the country. Tourism brings $471 million a year to Nepal.

According to statistics of 2012, there was a slow growth rate of 9.8%. According to statistics from Nepal Tourism Board (NTB), a total of 598,204 foreign tourists entered the country via aerial route in 2012. The government of Nepal declared 2011 to be Nepal Tourism Year, and hoped to attract one million foreign tourists to the country during that year. The government of Nepal has also declared Lumbini Tourism Year 2012 to promote Lumbini. The government of Nepal has also recently declared Visit Nepal 2020 with the aim of bringing in two million tourists by 2020.

According to the statistics of 2017, most of the tourists comes to Nepal for observing the pilgrimage sites and heritages sites of the country i.e. 70.3%, then 34.5% visit for pleasure, 13.1% of them visit Nepal for mountaineering and trekking and remaining 18.0% of the tourists arrive for official activities, conferences, business etc.

The tourism industry of Nepal was affected after the destructive earthquake in 2015, by the series of earthquakes in 2015. In 2020, the tourism sector in Nepal collapsed due to the COVID-19 pandemic.

Statistics
In 2007, the number of international tourists visiting Nepal was 526,705, which was an increase of 37.2% compared to the previous year. In 2008, the number of tourists decreased by 5% to 500,277. In 2018, the number of international tourists arrival was 1.17 million. Pokhara is one of the main tourist destinations in Nepal.

In 2008, 55.9% of the foreign visitors came from Asia (18.2% from India), while Western Europeans accounted for 27.5%, 7.6% were from North America, 3.2% from Australia and the Pacific Region, 2.6% from Eastern Europe, 1.5% from Central and South America, 0.3% from Africa and 1.4% from other countries.

Foreign tourists visiting Nepal in 2008 stayed in the country for an average of 11.78 days.

Arrivals

This statistic shows the number of international tourist arrivals by year, 1993–2019:

Arrivals by country
Most tourists arriving to Nepal on short-term basis were from the following countries of nationality:

Wilderness tourism

According to Nepal's Ministry of Tourism, major tourist activities include wilderness and adventure activities such as mountain biking, bungee jumping, rock climbing and mountain climbing, trekking, hiking, bird watching, flights, paragliding and hot air ballooning over the mountains of Himalaya, exploring the waterways by raft, kayak or canoe and jungle safaris especially in the Terai region. International elephant polo is played at  Chitwan National Park.

Religious sites

The majority religion in Nepal is Hinduism, and the Pashupatinath Temple, the world's largest temple of Shiva, located in Kathmandu, attracts many pilgrims and tourists. Other Hindu pilgrimage sites include the temple complex in Swargadwari in the Pyuthan district; Janaki Mandir in Janakpurdham in Mithila region; Lake Gosainkunda near Dhunche; the temples at Devghat; Kalinchowk Bhagwati Temple in Dolakha ;Manakamana temple in the Gorkha District; Pathibhara near Phungling; and Mahamrityunjaya Shivasan Nepal in Palpa District where the biggest metallic idol of Lord Shiva is located.

Buddhism is the largest minority religion. The World Heritage Site at Lumbini, which is traditionally considered to be the birthplace of Gautama Buddha, is an important pilgrimage site. Another prominent Buddhist site is Swayambhunath, the Monkey Temple, in Kathmandu.

Dang valley is a sacred place for Hindus as well as other religions. Kalika and Malika Devi in Chhillikot hill, Ambekeshawori temple, Krishna temple, Dharapani temple are among the sacred places in Dang district. Chillikot hill is also a good place for sightseeing and also an ancient palace of a king.

Muktinath is a sacred place for Hindus as well as Buddhists. The site is located in Muktinath Valley, Mustang district.

Badimalika temple in Bajura District, Gadhimai Temple in Bara district, Halesi Mahadeva temple in Khotang. Bhageshwori Mandir in Nepalgunj. Bhagbhati mandir in Rajbiraj are also some popular temples in Nepal.

See also
 Visa policy of Nepal

References

External links 
 
 Official tourism website
 Ministry of Tourism and Civil Aviation

 
Economy of Nepal
Nepal